There are two Saadat Ali Khans in history of Awadh, who have been Nawab of Awadh:

 Saadat Ali Khan I (b. c. 1680 – d. 1739)
 Saadat Ali Khan II (b. bf.1752 – d. 1814)